Tim Wright may refer to:

 Tim Wright (American football) (born 1990), American football tight end
 Tim Wright (bassist) (1952–2013), American bassist from Pere Ubu and DNA
 Tim Wright (engineer), Formula One engineer
 Tim Wright (English musician), English musician and recording artist
 Tim Wright (rower) (born 1973), Australian lightweight rower
 Tim Wright (Welsh musician) (born 1967), also known as CoLD SToRAGE, Welsh video game composer
 Tim Wright, early guitarist of rock band Primus
 Tim Wright (curler), American curler

See also
 Timothy Wright, American gospel singer